Accentus Music is a German classical music record label and production company founded in March 2010 in Leipzig, Germany, where the company is based.  The label produces audio recordings (CD) and video (DVD/Blu-ray).

History

Based in Leipzig, Germany, Accentus Music is a record label, film and audio production company that was founded by film producer Paul Smaczny; he had worked for EuroArts the 20 years prior to founding Accentus.  Accentus Music products have become well established in the contemporary classical and music research fields. Directors, screenwriters and cinematographers associated with productions for Accentus Music include Anne-Kathrin Peitz.

The company has its own staff of 12 producers, directors, camera operators, audio producers and editors. Establishing itself as a DVD/Blu-ray label on the classical music market in 2010, Accentus produces concert and opera recordings (audio and video) as well as feature-length documentaries and artist portraits.  The DVD and Blu-ray releases include productions featuring artists such as Claudio Abbado, Daniel Barenboim, Riccardo Chailly, Evgeny Kissin, Martha Argerich, the New York Philharmonic, the Staatskapelle Berlin as well as many others.  The products include classical music recordings, high-profile concert and opera performances as well as feature-length documentaries.   The label has also had a close association with the Gewandhausorchester Leipzig and the Staatskapelle Berlin.  Accentus works closely with major television production companies in Europe such as WDR, Arte, RBB, SWR, ZDF and numerous other broadcasters to produce special shows and documentaries for regularly scheduled programming. The company has over 160 commercial products available to date.

Productions by Accentus are regularly featured and film festivals around the world and have earned them numerous honors such as the 2017 "Czech Crystal", Gramophone Classical Music Award (2017), Label of the Year at the 2015 International Classical Music Awards (ICMA) as well and many others.  Reviews of Accentus recordings are consistently featured in classical music publications and major journals including Der Spiegel, Fono Forum, Rondo, Wiener Zeitung, Gramophone Magazine, BBC Music Magazine, the Guardian, Classic FM Magazine, Crescendo Magazine and International Record review.  The label has built and manages a YouTube channel which is viewed worldwide.   Accentus also uses WildKat PR for their promotion and distribution.  The label's recordings and DVD's are offered through numerous sites such as Presto Classical and Naxos Records.  In 2020 the label produced a commemorative set of videos to mark their 10th Anniversary.

Productions and distribution (partial lists)

Documentary
 The Unanswered Ives -- American Pioneer of Music  (2018)
 Maestras – The Long Journey Of Women To The Podium (2016)
 Music, War and Revolution – a three-part documentary series (2016)
 Arvo Pärt – The Lost Paradise (2015)
 Satiesfictions (2014)
 Sounds of the Sidewalk – On the Road with Buskers (2013/14)
 John Cage – Journeys in Sound (2012)
 A Year in the Life of the Boys Choir Leipzig (2012)

Live music video
 Mozart: Le Nozze di Figaro Staatsoper Unter den Linden, Berlin (2018)
 Lucerne Festival 2017 – Sir Simon Rattle’s farewell as principal conductor of Berliner Philharmoniker (2017)
 Mahler 8 – The Lucerne Festival Orchestra and its new music director Riccardo Chailly (2016)
 Berg’s Wozzeck with Christian Gerhaher at Zurich Opera House (2015)
 Vincenzo Bellini: Norma – From China NCPA Beijing (2015)
 St. Matthew Passion – St. Thomas Boys Choir Leipzig and Georg Christoph Biller (2012)
 Tango Buenos Aires – Café de los Maestros & Friends (2011)

Awards and honors

Awards for label

Awards for individual CDs, DVDs, documentaries and projects

References

External links
 
 
 
 Accentus Music, Avant Première 2019
 Accentus Music, Avant Première 2020, 10 Years

Record labels established in 2010
Film production companies of Germany
Companies based in Leipzig
Mass media companies of Germany
Classical music record labels
German record labels
Documentary film production companies
German brands
Music in Leipzig